Leandro Corona Ávila (born 6 April 1971) is a Brazilian former professional footballer who played at both club and international levels as a defensive midfielder.

References

 
 Sambafoot

Footballers from Porto Alegre
1971 births
Living people
Brazilian football managers
Brazilian footballers
1995 Copa América players
Brazilian expatriate footballers
Brazil international footballers
CR Vasco da Gama players
Botafogo de Futebol e Regatas players
Sport Club Internacional players
Sociedade Esportiva Palmeiras players
Fluminense FC players
CR Flamengo footballers
Al Hilal SFC players
Serrano Football Club players
Marília Atlético Clube players
Club Athletico Paranaense managers
Centro de Futebol Zico managers
Campeonato Brasileiro Série A managers
Saudi Professional League players
Association football midfielders